Faxon may refer to:

Places
 Faxon, Kentucky
 Faxon, Oklahoma
 Faxon, Pennsylvania

People with the surname
 Faxons of Massachusetts, U.S.:
 Lucia H. Faxon Additon (1847-1919), social reformer
 Charles Edward Faxon (1846–1918), botanist
 John Lyman Faxon (1851-1918), architect
 Walter Faxon (1848–1920), ornithologist, carcinologist, and taxonomist
 William Otis Faxon (1853-1942), politician
 Brad Faxon (born 1961), American professional golfer
 Jack Faxon (1936–2020), American educator and politician
 Nancy Plummer Faxon (1914–2005), American singer, music educator and organist
 Nat Faxon (born 1975), American actor

See also
 Faxonella, a genus of crayfish
 Faxonius, a genus of crayfish
 Faxonia'', a genus of flowering plants in the daisy family